Club Deportivo Maracaná San Rafael  is a Salvadoran professional football club based in San Rafael Obrajuelo, La Paz, El Salvador.

The club currently plays in the Tercera Division de Fútbol Salvadoreño.

External links
Maracanazo al Turín - El Gráfico 

Football clubs in El Salvador
Association football clubs established in 1998